The Family Hour may refer to:

 "The Family Hour" (Law & Order)
 "The Family Hour" (Lois & Clark: The New Adventures of Superman)